Ivo Ribeiro Soares (born 16 December 1938) is a Brazilian former footballer who competed in the 1964 Summer Olympics.

References

1938 births
Living people
Association football midfielders
Brazilian footballers
Olympic footballers of Brazil
Footballers at the 1964 Summer Olympics
CR Flamengo footballers